Saphan Hok is a bridge over the old city moat or Khlong Khu Mueang Doem. It's connected between Saranrom Park and Wat Ratchabophit in Bangkok's Phra Borom Maha Ratchawang and Wang Burapha Phirom sub-districts, Phra Nakhon district.

Its name translates as "tipping bridge". It's a bridge that can be drawn up for boats passing through. Originally, it was a wooden bridge that was built from the same type bridge in the Netherlands. In the early Rattanakosin period, there're eight Saphan Hok in the area of Bangkok, both the Phra Nakhon (Bangkok core side) and Thonburi sides. Nowadays they have already collapsed all, only one is here. In the reign of King Chulalongkorn (Rama V) was changed to a reinforced concrete for tram running through. The bridge-foot has been modified to a ladder and still this structure continues to this day.

Saphan Hok was restored as a pedestrian bridge in 1982 on the 200th anniversary of the Rattanakosin era, it was rebuilt following from the photographic document of the period.

See also
Saphan Han

References 

Phra Nakhon district
Bridges in Bangkok
Registered ancient monuments in Bangkok